KOZQ-FM (102.3 FM) is a radio station licensed to Waynesville, Missouri, United States. The station is currently owned by Alpha Media, through licensee Alpha Media Licensee LLC.

The station signed in on May 2, 1968 as KJPW-FM. Station call letters changed to KYSD in 1969, along with a top 40 format. By 1972, KYSD was programming country full-time. The station was assigned the call letters KJPW-FM on May 21, 1981. On December 13, 2007, the station changed its call sign to KIIK-FM, and on September 23, 2011, to the current KOZQ-FM

References

External links

OZQ-FM
Pulaski County, Missouri
Radio stations established in 1981
Alpha Media radio stations